Gianfranco Miccichè (born 1 April 1954 in Palermo, Sicily) is an Italian politician.

Biography
Gianfranco Miccichè was born into a wealthy family of Palermo.

He was business executive at the IRFIS company for eleven years.

In 1984, thanks to the knowledge of Marcello Dell'Utri, he became executive of Publitalia '80, a company led by Silvio Berlusconi. In 1993, together with other men of Publitalia '80, he joined Forza Italia, of which he was appointed regional coordinator in Sicily. 
In the 1994 general election he was elected for the first time in the Chamber of Deputies and served as Undersecretary at the Ministry of Transport and Navigation in the Berlusconi I Cabinet.

At the 1997 local elections he was candidate as mayor of Palermo for the Pole for Freedoms, but he was defeated by Leoluca Orlando.

In 2001 he served as Vice-Minister of Economy and Finance in the Berlusconi II Cabinet and in 2005 he was appointed Minister for Development and Territorial Cohesion in the Berlusconi III Cabinet.

In the 2006 Sicilian regional election he was elected in the Sicilian Regional Assembly, of which he was appointed President.

In the 2008 general election he was re-elected to the Chamber of Deputies. On 12 May 2008 the Council of Ministers appointed Miccichè as Undersecretary of State with responsibility for CIPE (Interministerial Committee for Economic Planning).

In 2010 he left The People of Freedom to found his own party, Force of the South, that in 2011 changed name into Great South.

At the 2012 Sicilian regional election he was candidate as President of the region and he gained the 15.41% of the votes, thus contributing to the defeat of the centre-right candidate Nello Musumeci and to the victory of the candidate of the centre-left Rosario Crocetta.

In the 2013 general election he was candidate for the Senate with his party Great South, but he was not elected. Subsequently, he was appointed as Undersecretary of State for Public Administration and Simplification in the Letta Cabinet but he resigned in August after that the Court of Cassation notified the condemnation of Berlusconi.

In November 2013 he joined the reborn Forza Italia.

In the 2014 European Parliament election he was candidate with Forza Italia, but he was not again elected, being the first of the unelected. He entered however in the European Parliament in 2018 when Salvo Pogliese is elected mayor of Catania, allowing Miccichè to take over his seat.

In the 2017 Sicilian regional election he was elected to the Sicilian Regional Assembly. On 16 December 2017 he has been elected President of the Assembly.

On 19 July 2018 he became an MEP to replace Salvo Pogliese, who resigned after being elected mayor of Catania. Despite the double mandate, he did not resign as an MEP, until the Court of Cassation declared him lapsed on 4 September 2018, due to incompatibility with his role as regional deputy. Innocenzo Leontini took his place in the European Parliament.

References

External links
 Gianfranco Miccichè's blog

1954 births
Living people
Deputies of Legislature XII of Italy
Deputies of Legislature XIII of Italy
Deputies of Legislature XIV of Italy
Deputies of Legislature XV of Italy
Deputies of Legislature XVI of Italy
Forza Italia politicians
The People of Freedom politicians
Forza Italia (2013) MEPs
Politicians from Palermo
Presidents of the Sicilian Regional Assembly
MEPs for Italy 2014–2019
Government ministers of Italy